Marius Daniel Berbecar (born 22 May 1985 in Bistrița) is a Romanian senior artistic gymnast, representing his nation at international competitions. He competed at world championships, including the 2009 World Artistic Gymnastics Championships in London, United Kingdom.

References 

1985 births
Living people
Romanian male artistic gymnasts
Gymnasts at the 2012 Summer Olympics
Olympic gymnasts of Romania
Gymnasts at the 2015 European Games
European Games medalists in gymnastics
European Games bronze medalists for Romania
Universiade medalists in gymnastics
Universiade silver medalists for Romania
Universiade bronze medalists for Romania
Medalists at the 2011 Summer Universiade
Sportspeople from Bistrița
21st-century Romanian people